The Glory to the Filmmaker Award, organized by the Venice film festival in collaboration with Jaeger-LeCoultre (2006-2020) and Cartier (2021-today). It is dedicated to personalities who have made a significant contribution to contemporary cinema. 

This is the list of winners:

References

See also
Venice Film Festival

Film directing awards
Awards established in 2006
Venice Film Festival